Bentiromide is a peptide used as a screening test for exocrine pancreatic insufficiency and to monitor the adequacy of supplemental pancreatic therapy. Bentiromide is not available in the United States or Canada; it was withdrawn in the US in October 1996.

Side effects 
Headache and gastrointestinal disturbances have been reported in patients taking bentiromide.

Mechanism of action 
Bentiromide is given by mouth as a noninvasive test. It is broken down by the pancreatic enzyme chymotrypsin, yielding p-aminobenzoic acid (PABA). The amount of PABA and its metabolites excreted in the urine is taken as a measure of the chymotrypsin-secreting activity of the pancreas.

Chemistry 
XLogP=3.201
H_bond_donor=4
H_bond_acceptor=5

Synthesis 

It is synthesized by amide formation between ethyl p-aminobenzoate and N-benzoyl-tyrosine using N-methyl-morpholine and ethyl chlorocarbonate for activation. The resulting L-amide is selectively hydrolyzed by sequential use of dimsyl sodium (NaDMSO) and dilute acid to give bentiromide (4).

See also 
 Chronic pancreatitis

References 

Benzoic acids